Furcillidens is a genus of molluscs belonging to the family Chaetodermatidae.

The species of this genus are found in Western America.

Species:
 Furcillidens incrasatus (Schwabl, 1963)

References

Molluscs